Losch or Lösch is a surname which may refer to:

 Abe Losch, a pseudonym of Harry J. Lincoln (1878-1937), American music composer
 August Lösch (1906–1945), German economist
 Claudia Losch (born 1960), retired shot putter who competed for West Germany
 Claudia Lösch (born 1988), Austrian Paralympian and alpine monoskier
 Dorothea Maria Lösch (1730–1799), Swedish master mariner, first woman Kapten in the Swedish Navy
 Fyodor Lesh (1840-1903), also spelled Lösch, Russian physician
 Hartmut Losch (1943-1997), discus thrower who competed for East Germany
 Helmut Losch (1947-2005), retired weightlifter who competed for East Germany
 Jack Losch (1934-2004), American Little League Baseball player, National Football League player, US Air Force fighter pilot and businessman
 Markus Lösch (born 1971), German retired footballer
 Mario Lösch (born 1989), Austrian footballer
 Tilly Losch, professional name of Ottilie Ethel Leopoldine Herbert, Countess of Carnarvon (1903-1975), Austrian-born dancer, choreographer, actress and painter

See also
 Loesch, another surname